Scott Andrews may refer to:

Scott K. Andrews (born 1971), English author
Scott Andrews (rugby union, born 1989), Wales international rugby union player, prop forward
Scott Andrews (rugby union, born 1994), Welsh rugby union player, lock forward
Scott Andrews (politician) (born 1974), Canadian politician
Scott Andrews (curler) (born 1989), Scottish curler